The 1869 Westmeath by-election was fought on 7 January 1869.  The by-election arose through the appointment of the incumbent member, Algernon Fulke Greville, as Parliamentary Groom in Waiting, requiring him to seek re-election as was the custom of the time.  It was retained by Greville who was unopposed.

By-elections to the Parliament of the United Kingdom in County Westmeath constituencies
1869 elections in the United Kingdom
Unopposed ministerial by-elections to the Parliament of the United Kingdom (need citation)
January 1869 events
1869 elections in Ireland